Abu al-hawl ('The Sphinx') was an Arabic-language newspaper published from São Paulo, Brazil, from 1906 to 1941. The paper was published by Rashid al-Khuri.

References

1906 establishments in Brazil
1941 disestablishments in Brazil
Arabic-language newspapers
Defunct newspapers published in Brazil
Mass media in São Paulo
Newspapers established in 1906
Publications disestablished in 1941